The 1954–55 Fort Wayne Pistons season was the seventh season for the Pistons in the National Basketball Association (NBA) and 14th season as a franchise. 

With new coach and former referee Charley Eckman, the Pistons finished 43-29 (.597), first in the NBA Western Division.  In the Western Division Finals, the Pistons eliminated the Minneapolis Lakers 3-1 in a best-of-five series to reach the NBA Finals.  In the 7-game series with the Syracuse Nationals, the teams held home court advantage, although Fort Wayne would play "at home" in Indianapolis because Fort Wayne arena management did not plan for the Pistons to make the NBA Finals, and the arena was booked for a bowling conference after March 4.
  
In the 7th game in Syracuse, Syracuse's George King made a free throw with 12 seconds left to put the Nationals up 92–91. King then stole the ball from Fort Wayne's Andy Phillip with three seconds remaining to clinch the victory for Syracuse.  

Rumors about the finish continue with suggestions that some Fort Wayne players conspired with gamblers to throw the series to Syracuse. In the 7th game, Fort Wayne led Syracuse 41–24 early in the second quarter, then allowed the Nationals to rally to win the game. Andy Phillip, who turned the ball over with three seconds left in the game, was believed by at least one of his teammates, George Yardley, to have thrown the game. "There were always unwholesome implications about that ball game", Yardley would later comment. 

However, Phillip may not have acted alone. Other Pistons players were strongly believed to have thrown games during the 1954 and 1955 NBA seasons, with Piston Jack Molinas banned from the league for gambling the year prior. In fact, Yardley himself turned the ball over to Syracuse with a palming violation with 18 seconds remaining in Game 7. The foul that gave Syracuse its winning free throw, meanwhile, was committed by Frankie Brian.  The NBA did not return to the 2–3–2 format until 1985. 

The team was led on the season by a double-double from center Larry Foust (17.0 ppg, 10.0 rpg, NBA All-Star), guard Andy Phillip (9.6 ppg, 7.7 apg, NBA All-Star) and forward George Yardley (17.3 ppg, 9.9 rpg, NBA All-Star).

Regular season

Season standings

x – clinched playoff spot

Record vs. opponents

Game log

Playoffs

|- align="center" bgcolor="#ccffcc"
| 1
| March 20
| Minneapolis
| W 96–79
| Larry Foust (15)
| North Side Gymnasium
| 1–0
|- align="center" bgcolor="#ccffcc"
| 2
| March 22
| Minneapolis
| W 98–97 (OT)
| Mel Hutchins (20)
| Butler Fieldhouse
| 2–0
|- align="center" bgcolor="#ffcccc"
| 3
| March 23
| @ Minneapolis
| L 91–99 (OT)
| George Yardley (25)
| Minneapolis Auditorium
| 2–1
|- align="center" bgcolor="#ccffcc"
| 4
| March 27
| @ Minneapolis
| W 105–96
| Rosenthal, Hutchins (21)
| Minneapolis Auditorium
| 3–1
|-

|- align="center" bgcolor="#ffcccc" 
| 1
| March 31
| @ Syracuse
| L 82–86
| Larry Foust (26)
| —
| Onondaga War Memorial7,500
| 0–1
|- align="center" bgcolor="#ffcccc" 
| 2
| April 2
| @ Syracuse
| L 84–87
| George Yardley (21)
| —
| Onondaga War Memorial5,845
| 0–2
|- align="center" bgcolor="#ccffcc" 
| 3
| April 3
| Syracuse
| W 96–89
| Mel Hutchins (23)
| —
| Butler Fieldhouse3,200
| 1–2
|- align="center" bgcolor="#ccffcc" 
| 4
| April 5
| Syracuse
| W 109–102
| Frankie Brian (18)
| —
| Butler Fieldhouse2,611
| 2–2
|- align="center" bgcolor="#ccffcc" 
| 5
| April 7
| Syracuse
| W 74–71
| George Yardley (16)
| —
| Butler Fieldhouse4,110
| 3–2
|- align="center" bgcolor="#ffcccc" 
| 6
| April 9
| @ Syracuse
| L 104–109
| George Yardley (31)
| —
| Onondaga War Memorial4,997
| 3–3
|- align="center" bgcolor="#ffcccc" 
| 7
| April 10
| @ Syracuse
| L 91–92
| Larry Foust (24)
| Andy Phillip (10)
| Onondaga War Memorial6,697
| 3–4
|-

Awards and records
Larry Foust, All-NBA First Team

References

Detroit Pistons seasons
Fort Wayne